The following are the association football events of the year 2008 throughout the world.

News

January 
3 – Argentine midfielder Éver Banega leaves Boca Juniors and joins the Spanish club Valencia for an estimated fee of €18 million.
5 – Everton are knocked out of the FA Cup in the third round by Oldham Athletic, a team from Football League One (third division) as Huddersfield Town from the same division beat Birmingham City.
6 – Toulouse are eliminated from the Coupe de France by Paris FC, a team from the Championnat National (third division).
9 – Sam Allardyce leaves the manager's position at Newcastle United by mutual agreement.
11 – Jürgen Klinsmann is unveiled as the new coach of Bayern Munich, effective July.
20 – The Africa Cup of Nations begins in Ghana with the hosts beating Guinea 2–1.
23 – Tottenham Hotspur defeat Arsenal 5–1 in the semi-final second-leg of the League Cup. This was the first time they had beaten their local rivals since 1999.
24 – George Burley is announced as the new coach of the Scotland national football team.
28 – Mohamed Sissoko leaves Liverpool to sign for Juventus, costing the Italian team €13 million.

February 
2 – Frédéric Kanouté is named 2007 African Footballer of the Year
4 – Víctor Muñoz is sacked from the managers job of Spanish team Recreativo Huelva; Manolo Zambrano is immediately installed as the new coach of the La Liga team.
 10 – Egypt win the 2008 Africa Cup of Nations after beating Cameroon in the final 1–0.
 13 – Giovanni Trapattoni is announced as the new coach of the Republic of Ireland. He will officially take up this role in May.
 23 – South Korean men's team won East Asian Cup 2008.
 23 – Japanese J. League Cup winner Gamba Osaka defeated MLS champion Houston Dynamo at the final game of Pan-Pacific Championship 2008 by 6–1, won the champion title of inaugural tournament. The Los Angeles Galaxy won the third place match against Sydney FC from A-league by 2–1.
 24 – Japan won the Women's East Asian Cup 2008 with three straight wins over South Korea, North Korea, and China.
 24 – Tottenham Hotspur win the Football League Cup after beating Chelsea 2–1 after extra time at Wembley Stadium.
 24 – Newcastle Jets win the Hyundai A-League Grand Final by defeating the Central Coast Mariners by 1–0 at the Sydney Football Stadium.

March 
11 – Newport County win the FAW Premier Cup beating Llanelli 1–0 in the final.
12 – The United States women's national soccer team wins the 2008 Algarve Cup for the sixth time, beating Denmark 2–1 in the final.
16 – Rangers win the Scottish League Cup by beating Dundee United 3–2 in a penalty shootout after a 2–2 draw at Hampden Park.

May 
5 – Real Madrid wins the 31st La Liga title after beating Osasuna 2–1.
8 – Announced that Frank Rijkaard would leave his managerial post at Barcelona at the end of the season, to be replaced by Barcelona B coach Pep Guardiola.
11 – Manchester United wins its tenth Premier League title after beating Wigan Athletic 2–0 away.
17 – Portsmouth wins the 127th FA Cup after beating Cardiff City 1–0 at Wembley Stadium
21 – Manchester United won the UEFA Champions League after beating Chelsea 6–5 on penalties after a 1–1 draw after 90 minutes in Moscow
22 – Celtic win the SPL title for the third successive season by three points from Rangers on the final day.
24 – Avram Grant is sacked as Chelsea manager after just eight months in charge of the Premier League club.

June 
2 – José Mourinho replaces Roberto Mancini as manager of Inter Milan
25 – LDU Quito won the first leg of the Copa Libertadores final beating Fluminense 4–2.
29 – Spain wins UEFA Euro 2008 after beating Germany 1–0 in the final.

July 
1 – Luiz Felipe Scolari becomes the new manager of Chelsea.
2 – LDU Quito wins the Copa Libertadores beating Fluminense in penalties 3–1 after a 5–5 aggregate draw.

August 
8 – Scottish Premier League team Gretna are formally liquidated.
21 – United States women's team win gold at the 2008 Summer Olympics
23 – Argentina's men's team win gold at the 2008 Summer Olympics

September 
1 – Manchester City sign Robinho from Real Madrid for a British record fee of £32.5 million
1 – Manchester United sign Dimitar Berbatov from Tottenham Hotspur for £30.75 million.
4 – Kevin Keegan resigns as manager of Newcastle United.

International tournaments

Men 
 20 January – 10 February: 2008 Africa Cup of Nations in 
 : 
 : 
 : 
 4th: 
 17 – 23 February: Men's East Asian Cup 2008 final in Chongqing, 
 : 
 : 
 : 
 4th: 
 11 – 23 March: 2008 CONCACAF Men's Pre-Olympic Tournament in Nashville, 
 : 
 : 
 : 
 4th: 
 4 – 16 May: 2008 UEFA European Under-17 Football Championship in 
 : 
 : 
 :  and 
 : 
 : 
 :  and 
 30 May – 1 June: Baltic Cup in Riga, 
 : 
 : 
 : 
 : 
 : 
 30 July – 13 August: AFC Challenge Cup, 
 : 
 : 
 : 
 4th: 
 7 – 23 August: 2008 Summer Olympics – Men's tournament in Beijing, 
 : 
 : 
 : 
 : 
 : 
 : ,

Women 
 18 – 24 February: Women's East Asian Cup 2008 final in Chongqing, 
 : 
 : 
 : 
 4th: 
 5 – 12 March: 2008 Algarve Cup in Algarve, 
 : 
 : 
 : 
 4th: 
 6 – 21 August: 2008 Summer Olympics – Women's tournament in Beijing, 
 : 
 : 
 : 
 30 October – 16 November: 2008 FIFA U-17 Women's World Cup in 
 : 
 : 
 : 
 4th: 
 20 November – 7 December: 2008 FIFA U-20 Women's World Cup in 
 : 
 : 
 : 
 4th:

National champions

AFC nations
 A-League: Newcastle Jets
 Bahraini Premier League: Muharraq Club
 Chinese Super League: Shandong Luneng
 Hong Kong First Division League: South China
 I-League: Dempo SC
 Liga Indonesia Premier Division: Sriwijaya
 Persian Gulf Cup: Persepolis F.C.
 J. League: Kashima Antlers
 K-League: Suwon Samsung Bluewings
 Lebanese Premier League: Al Ahed
 Saudi Premier League: Al-Hilal
 Filipino Premier League: Philippine Army F.C.
 Malaysian Super League: Kedah FA
 Qatar Stars League: Al-Gharafa Sports Club
 S-League: Singapore Armed Forces Football Club
 Thailand Premier League: Provincial Electricity Authority FC
 Turkmenistan Higher League: FC Aşgabat
 Enterprise Football League: Taipower
 UAE Football League: Al-Shabab
 Uzbek League: Bunyodkor
 V-League: Becamex Bình Dương

UEFA nations
 Albanian Superliga: Dinamo Tirana
 Campionat de Lliga: Santa Coloma
 Armenian Premier League: Pyunik
 Austrian Bundesliga: Rapid Wien
 Azerbaijan Premier League: Inter Baku
 Belarusian Premier League: BATE Borisov
 Belgian Pro League: Standard Liège
 Premier League of Bosnia and Herzegovina: Modriča
 Bulgarian A PFG: CSKA Sofia
 Prva HNL: Dinamo Zagreb
 Cypriot First Division: Anorthosis Famagusta
 Gambrinus Liga: Slavia Prague
 Danish Superliga: Aalborg BK
 Premier League: Manchester United
 Meistriliiga: Levadia Tallinn
 Formuladeildin: EB/Streymur
 Veikkausliiga: Inter Turku
 Ligue 1: Lyon
 Umaglesi Liga: Dinamo Tbilisi
 Bundesliga: Bayern Munich
 Superleague Greece: Olympiacos
 Hungarian National Championship I: MTK Budapest
 Úrvalsdeild: FH Hafnarfjörður
 League of Ireland Premier Division: Bohemian
 Ligat ha'Al: Beitar Jerusalem
 Serie A: Inter Milan
 Kazakhstan Premier League: Aktobe
 Latvian Higher League: Ventspils
 A Lyga: Ekranas
 Luxembourg National Division: F91 Dudelange
 Macedonian Prva Liga: Rabotnički
 Maltese Premier League: Valletta
 Moldovan National Division: Sheriff Tiraspol
 Montenegrin First League: Budućnost Podgorica
 Eredivisie: PSV
 Irish Premier League: Linfield
 Norwegian Premier League: Stabæk
 Ekstraklasa: Wisła Kraków
 Primeira Liga: Porto
 Liga I: CFR Cluj
 Russian Premier League: Rubin Kazan
 Campionato Sammarinese di Calcio: Murata
 Scottish Premier League: Celtic
 Serbian Superliga: Partizan
 Slovak Superliga: Artmedia Bratislava
 Slovenian PrvaLiga: NK Domžale
 La Liga: Real Madrid
 Allsvenskan: Kalmar
 Swiss Super League: Basel
 Süper Lig: Galatasaray
 Ukrainian Premier League: Shakhtar Donetsk
 Welsh Premier League: Llanelli

CAF nations
 Algerian Championnat National: JS Kabylie
 Girabola: Petro Atlético Luanda
 Mascom Premier League: Centre Chiefs
 Burkinabé Premier League: Etoile Filante Ouagadougou
 Burundi Premier League: Inter Star
 MTN Elite one: Cotonsport Garoua
 Cape Verdean football Championships: Sporting Clube da Praia
 Chad Premier League: Elect Sport N'Djamena
 Comoros Premier League: Etoile d'Or
 Congo Premier League: CARA Brazzaville
 Linafoot: DC Motema Pembe
 Côte d'Ivoire Premier Division: Africa Sports National
 Djibouti Premier League: Société Immobilière de Djibouti
 Egyptian Premier League: Al-Ahly
 Eritrean Premier League: Asmara Brewery
 Ethiopian Premier League: Saint-George SA
 Gabon Championnat National D1: AS Mangasport
 Gambian Championnat National D1: Wallidan
 OneTouch Premier League: Asante Kotoko
 Guinée Championnat National: Fello Star
 Campeonato Nacional da Guiné-Bissau: Sporting Clube de Batafá
 Kenyan Premier League: Mathare United
 Lesotho Premier League: Lesotho Correctional Services
 Liberian Premier League: Black Star
 Libyan Premier League: Al Ittihad
 THB Champions League: Académie Ny Antsika
 Malawi Premier Division: Silver Strikers
 Malien Première Division: Djoliba
 Mauritanean Premier League: ASAC Concorde
 Mauritian League: Curepipe Starlight
 Botola: FAR Rabat
 Moçambola: Ferroviario de Maputo
 Namibia Premier League: Orlando Pirates Windhoek
 Niger Premier League: AS Police
 Nigerian Premier League: Kano Pillars
 Réunion Premier League: JS Saint-Pierroise
 Rwandan Premier League: ATRACO
 Senegal Premier League: AS Douanes
 Seychelles League: Saint-Michel United
 Sierra Leone National Premier League: Ports Authority F.C.
 Somalia League: Elman FC
 Premier Soccer League: SuperSport United
 Sudan Premier League: Al-Merrikh
 Swazi Premier League: Royal Leopards
 Tanzanian Premier League: Young Africans
 Tunisian CLP-1: Club Africain
 Ugandan Super League: Kampala City Council
 Zambian Premier League: ZESCO United
 Zanzibar Premier League: Miembeni
 Zimbabwe Premier Soccer League: Monomotapa United

CONMEBOL nations
 Primera División Argentina: River Plate (C) / Boca Juniors (A)
 Liga de Fútbol Profesional Boliviano: Universitario (A) / Aurura (C)
 Campeonato Brasileiro Série A: São Paulo
 Primera División de Chile: Everton (A) / Colo-Colo (C)
 Colombian Professional Football: Boyacá Chicó (A) / América de Cali (C)
 Serie A de Ecuador: Deportivo Quito
 Primera División de Paraguay: Libertad (A) (C)
 Primera División Peruana: U. San Martín
 Primera División Uruguaya: Defensor Sporting
 Primera División Venezolana: Deportivo Táchira
(A = Apertura, C= Clausura)

CONCACAF nations

 BFA Senior League: IM Bears
 Digicel Premiere League: Notre Date Sports Club
 Belize Premier Football League: Hankook Verdes
 Bermudian Premier Division: PHC Zebras
 British Virgin Islands Championship: Islanders
 Canadian Soccer League: Trois-Rivières Attak
 Cayman Islands League: Scholars International
 Primera División de Costa Rica: Saprissa (A) (C)
 Campeonato Nacional de Fútbol de Cuba: Cienfuegos
 Dominica Championship: Centre Bath Estate
 Primera División de Fútbol de El Salvador: Firpo (C) / Isidro Metapán (A)
 Liga Nacional de Fútbol de Guatemala: Comunicaciones (C) (A)
 Grenada League: Carib Hurricane
 Ligue Haïtienne: Racing Gonaïves (C) / Tempête (A)
 Liga Nacional de Fútbol de Honduras: Marathón (C) / Olimpia (A)
 National Premier League: Portmore United
 Primera División de México: Santos Laguna (C) / Toluca (A)
 Nevis Premier Division: SL Horsford Highlights
 Primera División de Nicaragua: Real Estelí
 Liga Panameña de Fútbol: Árabe Unido (C) / San Francisco (A)
 Puerto Rico Soccer League: Sevilla
 Saint Kitts Premier Division: Newtown United
 Saint Lucia Premier Division: Aux Lyons United
 NLA Premier League: Avenues United
 Sint Maarten League: D&P Connection
 Surinamese Hoofdklasse: Inter Moengotapoe
 TT Pro League: San Juan Jabloteh
 MFL League: Beaches
 Major League Soccer: Columbus Crew
 US Virgin Islands Championship: Positive Vibes
(A = Apertura, C= Clausura)

OFC nations
 Football Federation American Samoa Soccer League: Pago Youth
 Cook Islands Round Cup: Nikao Sokattack
 Fijian National Football League: Ba
 FSMFA Top League: Yap
 Kiribati National Championship: competition canceled
 New Caledonia Division Honneur: AS Magenta
 ASB Premiership: Waitakere United
 Niue Soccer Tournament: Talava
 Norfolk Island Soccer League: unknown
 Palau Soccer League: Surangel & Sons Company
 Papua New Guinea National Soccer League: PRK Hekari United
 Samoa National League: Sinamoga
 Solomon Islands National Club Championship: Koloale
 Tahiti Division Fédérale: AS Manu-Ura
 Tonga Major League: Lotoha'apai
 Tuvalu A-Division: Nauti
 Vanuatu Premia Divisen: Tafea

Deaths

January 
 1 January – Božidar Sandić (85), Serbian footballer, Yugoslavia international
 4 January – Vyacheslav Ambartsumyan (67), Russian footballer, Soviet Union international
 4 January – Bjørn Odmar Andersen (64), Norwegian international footballer and manager
 5 January – Louis Hon (83), French international footballer
 9 January – Paul Aimson (64), English footballer
 11 January – Frank Loughran (77), Australian international footballer
 12 January – Leszek Jezierski (78), Polish footballer and manager
 13 January – Seyran Osipov (46), Russian footballer
 14 January – Kaj Christiansen (86), Danish international footballer and manager
 14 January – Johnny Steele (91), English footballer and manager
 18 January – Wally Fielding (88), English footballer
 21 January – Billy Elliott (82), English international footballer
 24 January – Jorge Recio (66), Argentine international footballer
 26 January – Celestino Celio (82), Italian international footballer and manager
 27 January – Bengt Lindskog (74), Swedish international footballer
 28 January – Eleuterio Santos (67), Spanish international footballer

February 
 1 February – Władysław Kawula (70), Polish footballer
 2 February – Yiu Cheuk Yin (80), Hong Kong footballer
 9 February – Guy Tchingoma (22), Gabonese footballer
 10 February – Ove Jørstad (37), Norwegian footballer
 12 February – Jean Prouff (88), French footballer and manager
 12 February – Thomas Grosser (42), German footballer
 14 February – Len Boyd (84), English footballer
 15 February – Inge Thun (62), Norwegian footballer
 17 February – Brian Harris (72), English footballer and manager
 21 February – Emmanuel Sanon (56), Haitian footballer

March 
 2 March – Carl Hoddle (40), English footballer
 5 March – Derek Dooley (78), English footballer and manager
 25 March – Thierry Gilardi (49), French commentator

April 
 3 April – Hrvoje Ćustić (24), Croatian footballer
 5 April – Wang Donglei (23), Chinese footballer
 18 April – Erminio Favalli (64), Italian footballer
 19 April – Constant Vanden Stock (93), Belgian footballer, manager, and executive

May 
 8 May – François Sterchele (26), Belgian footballer
 10 May – Eusebio Ríos (73), Spanish footballer and manager
 15 May – Tommy Burns (51), Scottish former footballer and manager
 23 May – Heinrich Kwiatkowski (81), German footballer

June 
 6 June – Victor Wégria (71), Belgian footballer
 11 June – Adam Ledwoń (34), Polish footballer
 22 June – Ron Stitfall (82), Welsh footballer

July 
 13 July – Rudolf Nafziger (62), German footballer
 15 July – Gionata Mingozzi (23), Italian footballer
 18 July – George Niven (79), Scottish footballer

August 
 3 August – Anton Allemann (72), Swiss footballer

September 
 3 September – Joan Segarra (80), Spanish defender
 4 September – Tommy Johnston (81), Scottish footballer
 25 September – Jimmy Sirrel (86), Scottish football player and manager

October 
 October 8 - Chicão, Brazilian midfielder, semi-finalist at the 1978 FIFA World Cup. (59)
 October 21 - George Edwards (87), Welsh footballer
 October 25 - Ian McColl (81), Scottish football player and manager

November 
 1 November – Dermot Curtis (76), Irish football player and manager
 17 November – Peter Aldis (81), English footballer
 27 November – Gil Heron (87), Jamaican footballer

December 
 8 December – John Cumming (78), Scottish footballer
 9 December – Dražan Jerković (72), Croatian football player and manager
 9 December – Ibrahim Dossey (36), Ghanaian footballer
 12 December – Maksym Pashayev (20), Ukrainian footballer

References

 
Association football by year